Carl Heinz Carrell (December 16, 1893June 6, 1958) was a German stage and film actor.

Carl Heinz Carrell appeared in nine movies between 1932 and 1955, mostly in small roles. He also worked as a stage actor and as the German dubbing voice for actors such as James Gleason in The Night of the Hunter and John Carradine in Johnny Guitar.

Filmography
 Herr über Leben und Tod (1955)
 The Staircase (1950)
 Girls Behind Bars (1949)
 The Roundabouts of Handsome Karl (1938)
 The Beaver Coat (1937)
 Gabriele: eins, zwei, drei (1937)
 Augustus the Strong (1936)
 Unheimliche Geschichten (1932)
 The Living Dead (1932)
 Kuhle Wampe oder: Wem gehört die Welt? (1932)

References

External links

1890s births
1958 deaths

Year of birth uncertain
German male stage actors
German male film actors
20th-century German male actors